Qubo was an American broadcast television network that was owned by Ion Media Networks. The network had affiliation agreements with 67 other television stations, the vast majority of which were owned by its corporate parent. Qubo also distributed its base national programming feed directly to cable, satellite and IPTV providers in various ways not elaborated on here.

This article is a listing of the network's former affiliates, including subchannel affiliates, satellite stations and select low-power translators), arranged alphabetically by state, then the station's city of license, followed in parentheses by the main market city.

The station's virtual (PSIP) channel number follows the call letters, and is itself followed by the station's actual digital channel number, which are listed as separate columns. The article also includes a list of its former affiliate stations before the network's which is based strictly on the station's city of license or market, and denotes the years in which the station served as an affiliate.

Final affiliates
Notes:
 This list includes Ion Media Networks-owned stations (most of which incorporates the letters "PX" in their call signs, in reference to the pre-2007 name of its corporate parent, Paxson Communications), which are also listed separately from its affiliated stations in the article List of stations owned and operated by Ion Media Networks. 
 This list does not include parent network Ion Television and sister network Ion Plus, which were carried on most of the stations listed. For a list of affiliates of those networks, see List of Ion Television affiliates and List of Ion Plus affiliates.

Former affiliates before shut down

References

External links
 

Qubo